The 2009 Canadian Tour season ran from November 2008 to October 2009 and consisted of 16 tournaments. It was the 40th season of the Canadian Professional Golf Tour.

The season started with three events in Central and South America in late 2008, followed by an event in April in Mexico, 10 events in Canada (June to September), and ending with two events in Mexico (rescheduled from May). Canadian Graham DeLaet won the Order of Merit.

Schedule
The following table lists official events during the 2009 season.

Order of Merit
The Order of Merit was based on prize money won during the season, calculated in Canadian dollars.

Notes

References

External links
Official site

Canadian Tour
PGA Tour Canada